The Three Days of Darkness is an eschatological prophecy of future events, held by some Catholics to be true. The prophecy foretells three days and nights of "an intense darkness" over the whole earth, against which the only light will come from blessed beeswax candles, and during which "all the enemies of the Church ... will perish."

The prophecy parallels the Ten Plagues against Egypt in the Book of Exodus (Ex. 10:21–29). The Apocalypse of John also mentions a plague of unnatural darkness as an effect of the sixth seal (Rev. 6:12) and fifth vial (Rev. 16:10). However, the specifics of the "Three Days of Darkness" prophecy are derived from private revelation.

Exodus 10:25

Advocates 
Blessed Anna Maria Taigi (1769–1837) is the most known seer of the Three Days of Darkness and describes the event in this way:
There shall come over the whole earth an intense darkness lasting three days and three nights. Nothing can be seen, and the air will be laden with pestilence which will claim mainly, but not only, the enemies of religion. It will be impossible to use any man-made lighting during this darkness, except blessed candles. He, who out of curiosity, opens his window to look out, or leaves his home, will fall dead on the spot. During these three days, people should remain in their homes, pray the Rosary and beg God for mercy. All the enemies of the Church, whether known or unknown, will perish over the whole earth during that universal darkness, with the exception of a few whom God will soon convert. The air shall be infected by demons who will appear under all sorts of hideous forms.

Marie-Julie Jahenny (1850–1941), known as the "Breton Stigmatist," expanded upon the story of the Three Days of Darkness. According to Jahenny, it would occur on a Thursday, Friday and Saturday; all of Hell would be let loose to strike at those outside their homes and those without a lit blessed candle of pure wax. These candles would miraculously stay aflame the entire period, but not light at all in the houses of the godless.

Controversy 
Some sedevacantists hope that a true Pope will be miraculously designated by an apparition of Saint Peter and Saint Paul; this tangential belief assumes that the  pontiffs in those times of the Church will be, in fact "antipopes". There is also controversy over whether the twentieth-century saint and stigmatist Padre Pio endorsed and taught on the future Three Days of Darkness, as the authenticity of the alleged words of Saint Pio are disputed.

See also
Crucifixion darkness
Plagues of Egypt 
Rapture

References 

Apocalypticism
Catholic theology and doctrine